Sazonov or Sozonov and Sazonova (feminine) is a common Russian surname derived from the baptismal name Sazon.

People with this surname include:
 Igor Sazonov, Russian terrorist
 Sergey Sazonov, a Russian politician
 Vasily Sazonov, a Russian painter
 Vyacheslav Sazonov, a Soviet mathematician who proved Sazonov's theorem

References